The mitochondrial dicarboxylate carrier (DIC) is an integral membrane protein encoded by the SLC25A10 gene in humans that catalyzes the transport of dicarboxylates such as malonate, malate, and succinate across the inner mitochondrial membrane in exchange for phosphate, sulfate, and thiosulfate by a simultaneous antiport mechanism, thus supplying substrates for the Krebs cycle, gluconeogenesis, urea synthesis, fatty acid synthesis, and sulfur metabolism.

Structure 
The SLC25A10 gene is located on the q arm of chromosome 17 in position 25.3 and spans 8,781 base pairs. The gene has 11 exons and produces a 31.3 kDa protein composed of 287 amino acids. Intron 1 of this gene has five short Alu sequences. Mitochondrial dicarboxylate carriers are dimers, each consisting of six transmembrane domains with both the N- and C- terminus exposed to the cytoplasm. Like all mitochondrial carriers, dicarboxylate carriers features a tripartite structure with three repeats of about 100 amino acid residues, each of which contains a conserved sequence motif. These three tandem sequences fold into two anti-parallel transmembrane α-helices linked by hydrophilic sequences.

Function 
A crucial function of dicarboxylate carriers is to export malate from the mitochondria in exchange for inorganic phosphate. Dicarboxylate carriers are highly abundant in the adipose tissue and play a central role in supplying cytosolic malate for the citrate transporter, which then exchanges cytosolic malate for mitochondrial citrate to begin fatty acid synthesis. Abundant levels of DIC are also detected in the kidneys and liver, whereas lower levels are found in the lung, spleen, heart, and brain. Dicarboxylate carriers are involved in glucose-stimulated insulin secretion through pyruvate cycling, which mediates NADPH production, and by providing cytosolic malate as a counter-substrate for citrate export. It is also involved in reactive oxygen species (ROS) production through hyperpolarization of mitochondria and increases ROS levels when overexpressed. Furthermore, dicarboxylate carriers are crucial for cellular respiration, and inhibition of DIC impairs complex I activity in mitochondria.

Regulation 
Insulin causes a dramatic (approximately 80%) reduction of DIC expression in mice, whereas free fatty acids induces DIC expression. Cold exposure, which increases energy expenditure and decreases fatty acid biosynthesis, resulted in a significant (approximately 50%) reduction of DIC expression. DIC is inhibited by some dicarboxylate analogues, such as butylmalonate, as well as bathophenanthroline and thiol reagents such as Mersalyl and p-hydroxymercuribenzoate. The activity of dicarboxylate carriers has also been found to be upregulated in plants in response to stress. The rate of malonate uptake is inhibited by 2-oxoglutarate and unaffected by citrate, whereas the rates of succinate and malate uptake are inhibited by both 2-oxoglutarate and citrate.

Disease relevance 
Suppression of SLC25A10 down-regulated fatty acid synthesis in mice, resulting in decreased lipid accumulation in adipocytes. Additionally, knockout of SLC25A10 inhibited insulin-stimulated lipogenesis in adipocytes. These findings presents a possible target for anti-obesity treatments. It is also upregulated in tumors, which is likely because it regulates energy metabolism and redox homeostasis, both of which are frequently altered in tumor cells. In non-small cell lung cancer (NSCLC) cells, inhibition of SLC25A10 was found to increase the sensitivity to traditional anticancer drugs, and thus may present a potential target for anti-cancer strategies. Furthermore, overexpression of dicarboxylate carriers in renal proximal tubular cells has been found to cause a reversion to a non-diabetic state and protect cells from oxidative injury. This finding supports the dicarboxylate carriers as a potential therapeutic target to correct underlying metabolic disturbances in diabetic nephropathy.

Interactions 
This protein has binary interactions with NOTCH2NL, KRTAP5-9, KRTAP4-2, KRTAP10-8, MDFI, and KRT40.

See also 
 Solute carrier family

References

Further reading 

 
 
 
 
 
 

Solute carrier family
Membrane proteins